Cerithiopsidella is a genus of  very small sea snails, marine gastropod molluscs in the family Cerithiopsidae. It was described by Bartsch in 1911.

Species
 Cerithiopsidella alcima (Bartsch, 1911)
 Cerithiopsidella antefilosa (Bartsch, 1911)
 Cerithiopsidella blacki Marshall, 1978
 Cerithiopsidella caterinae Cecalupo & Perugia, 2014
 Cerithiopsidella chiarellii Cecalupo & Perugia, 2018
 Cerithiopsidella cornea Cecalupo & Perugia, 2017
 Cerithiopsidella cosmia (Bartsch, 1907)
 † Cerithiopsidella propria (Laws, 1941) 
 † Cerithiopsidella pustulosa Lozouet, 1999 
 Cerithiopsidella ziliolii Cecalupo & Perugia, 2012

References

 Lozouet, P., 1999. - Nouvelles espèces de gastéropodes (Mollusca: Gastropoda) de l'Oligocène et du Miocène inférieur d'Aquitaine (sud-ouest de la France). Partie 2. Cossmanniana 6(1-2): 1-68

External links
 Bartsch P. (1911). The Recent and fossil mollusks of the genus Cerithiopsis from the west coast of America. Proceedings of the United States National Museum. 40(1823): 327-367, pls 36-41
 Marshall B. (1978). Cerithiopsidae of New Zealand, and a provisional classification of the family. New Zealand Journal of Zoology 5(1): 47-120

Cerithiopsidae
Gastropod genera